The University of Gafsa is a public university located in Gafsa, Tunisia. The university is oriented primarily toward sciences and information technology

Organization 
 National Engineering School of Gafsa

References

See also
List of schools in Tunisia
List of universities in Tunisia

 
2004 establishments in Tunisia
Gafsa
Educational institutions established in 2004